Beauvais Township is a subdivision of Ste. Genevieve County, Missouri, in the United States of America, and is one of the five townships located in Ste. Genevieve County.

Name

The township was named in honor of Jean Baptiste St. Gemme Beauvais, an official of the county.

History

Beauvais Township is a township in Ste. Genevieve, County, Missouri.  The township was formed in 1832 from parts of Saline and Ste. Genevieve Townships.

Populated places

There are two towns in Beauvais Township, with a population of 543.  Approximately 1,246 people live in the remaining area of the township.

Minnith
River aux Vases
Ozora

The township also contains three churches: Saints Phillip and James Catholic Church, Saline Baptist Church, and Sacred Heart Catholic Church, as well as the following cemeteries: Mange, Hand, Brown, Roth, Saint Marys, and Voekler.

Geography

Beauvais Township is located in the southeastern section of Ste. Genevieve County.  A number of streams run through the township: Johns Creek, Bluff Creek, Walnut Creek, Tube Creek, River aux Vases, Saline Creek, Brushy Creek, Idlewild Slough, and Mitchel Slough.  Lakes and reservoirs in the township include: Cedar Valley Lake, Donze Lake, Minnehaha Lake, Kisco Lake, Foerster Lake, Lake Minnie Ha-Ha Lower, Lake Minnie Ha-Ha Upper, and Salt Petre Lake.

2000 census
The 2000 census shows Beauvais township consisting of 810 housing units with a population of 1,800 individuals.

2010 census

As of the census of 2010, there were 1,789 people, with a population density of 22.1 per square mile (68.6 km2), residing in the township. The racial makeup of the town was 97.32% White, 1.06% African American, 0.56% Native American and Alaska Native, 0.11% Asian, and 0.22% from other races, and 0.73% from two or more races.

References

Geography of Ste. Genevieve County, Missouri
Townships in Missouri